Elections to High Peak Borough Council in Derbyshire, England were held on 5 May 1983. All of the council was up for election and the council stayed under no overall control.

After the election, the composition of the council was:
Conservative 18
Labour 14
SDP-Liberal Alliance 2
Independent 10

Election result

Ward results

References

1983
High Peak
1980s in Derbyshire